A membership campground is a private campground and/or RV park open only to members. Members typically pay a one-time membership fee and annual dues (membership fees) for the right to use the campground. A membership campground can operate independently, selling memberships to customers who have access only to that individual property, or they can operate as part of a system, in which case members can buy access to multiple campgrounds. Membership campgrounds tend to be geared toward the owners of recreational vehicles, but often offer rental accommodations and spaces for tent camping.

Membership Campgrounds in North America

In 2008, Thousand Trails, a company which owns membership campgrounds in the United States and Canada, claimed to operate "the world's largest network of private membership camping resorts." It was merged with its principal competitor, NACO (National American Corporation), another membership campground company, in 1991. The total combined membership of Thousand Trails and NACO was 128,000 in 1996. American companies such as Coast to Coast Resorts (formerly Camp Coast to Coast) and Resort Parks International offer memberships to networks of private campgrounds owned by multiple companies.

Media Coverage and Criticism

Both the Los Angeles Times and the New York Times published articles on the growth of membership campground companies in 1980s. In each case, the coverage noted criticism of the industry and compared membership campgrounds to timeshares.

In an article entitled "Newest RV Phenomenon has Campgrounds Going RSVP" in the November 28, 1980, edition of the Los Angeles Times, staff writer Ted Vollmer characterized "membership-only resort parks catering to recreational vehicle owners" as "either about the smartest investment or the most ridiculous scheme ever served up to the camping public— depending on who's doing the talking." The same report noted that, "Unlike time-sharing schemes involving resort-area condominiums, the campground site is never owned by the camper who buys into a membership park. This fact alone has prompted some private campground owners and campers to question the wisdom of signing up at fees as high as $7,000."

On June 22, 1986, the New York Times ran an article entitled "Campgrounds that Double as Clubs," explaining that "membership campgrounds tout themselves as destination resorts, where families can get away for a weekend or longer in an atmosphere that is a mixture of natural retreat and private country club." The same article reported that Thousand Trails, Inc., had revenues of $128 million the previous year. It also noted that "Like time-share resorts, many of the membership campgrounds do mass mailings to invite people to tour their facilities. The trade press has sharply criticized them for badgering prospective customers with high-pressure sales techniques, or offering nonexistent prizes in promotions."

External links

Membership Campground Companies
Travel Resorts Of America
Thousand Trails
Coast to Coast Resorts
Resort Parks International

References

Campsites
Clubs and societies
Recreational vehicles